Samudhayam is a 1995 Indian Malayalam-language film, directed by Ambili. The film stars Madhu, K. P. A. C. Lalitha, Ashokan and Baiju in the lead roles. The film has musical score by G. Devarajan.

Cast
 Madhu
 K. P. A. C. Lalitha
 Ashokan
 Baiju
 Idavela Babu
 Maathu
 N. F. Varghese
 Biju Menon
 Vinduja Menon
 Mamukkoya
 Kalabhavan Mani

Soundtrack
The music was composed by G. Devarajan and the lyrics were written by O. N. V. Kurup and P. Bhaskaran.

References

External links
 

1995 films
1990s Malayalam-language films